Einhausen is a municipality in the Bergstraße district in Hesse, Germany, some 15 km east of Worms.

Geography

Location

Einhausen lies on the Bergstraße in the Hessisches Ried and belongs the northeast Rhine valley, which has a rather favourable climate. Surrounding the community, through which flows the Weschnitz, are woods and cultivated land.

Neighbouring communities
Einhausen borders in the north on the community of Groß-Rohrheim and the town of Gernsheim (Groß-Gerau district), in the east on the towns of Bensheim and Lorsch, in the south on the town of Bürstadt and in the west on the community of Biblis.

Constituent communities
Einhausen officially consists of only one Ortsteil; however, the historical distinction between Groß-Hausen and Klein-Hausen is still heard in speech.

History
The community was donated in 768 under the name Husun to the Lorsch Abbey. In the course of the Reformation and the Counterreformation there arose two politically and ecclesiastically divided communities: Groß-Hausen (Protestant), and Klein-Hausen (Catholic) which contradictorily became the larger of the two. On 1 April 1937, the two communities were merged into the community of Einhausen. (Older residents often tell the visitor that this merger was one of many mergers endorsed and signed into effect by Adolf Hitler.) As mentioned earlier, the historical distinction between Groß-Hausen and Klein-Hausen is still heard in speech today, even by younger residents.

Politics

Community council
The municipal election held on 26 March 2006 yielded the following results:

Coat of arms
The community’s arms might be described thus: Gules a brick house Or with roof, two chimneys, a door and two windows sable, the whole on an arched bridge Or.

The bridge is symbolic of the merger of the two former communities, which were divided for centuries.

Town partnerships
  Attichy, Oise, France
  Shoreview, Minnesota, USA

Regular events

Kirchweih/Kerwe
Einhausen’s Kirchweih (church consecration festival) is held each year on the first weekend in October. It is staged by the Verein zur Erhaltung der Tradition Einhausen e.V. (“Einhausen Club for Maintaining Tradition”) in collaboration with the three festival groups ADI, CHIEF and Ladännsche. Known well beyond Einhausen is the parade at this festival, which is run on the first Sunday in October.

The float built in 2007 on the theme “North Korea” was featured in the November edition of the Carnival magazine Tusch!!! (a national trade magazine published around Carnival) as Germany’s best political float of 2007.

Carnival
Known in this part of Germany as Fastnacht, this includes four of the Sitzungen (“sittings” or “sessions”) that typify this celebration. Three are Narrengiggelsitzungen and one is a Kindersitzung (for children). They are staged by the Verein zur Erhaltung der Tradition Einhausen e.V. (see above).

References

External links

 Internetpräsenz der Community’s official webpage 

Bergstraße (district)